The Constitution Amendment (Pledge of Loyalty) Act 2006 No 6, was an Act to amend the Constitution Act 1902 to require Members of the New South Wales Parliament and its Ministers to take a pledge of loyalty to Australia and to the people of New South Wales instead of swearing allegiance to Queen Elizabeth II her heirs and successors, and to revise the oaths taken by Executive Councillors. The Act was assented to by the Queen on 3 April 2006.

Enactments
In 2006 the NSW parliament, the oldest and most senior of the Australian States, passed an Act to remove requirements for members of their Legislative Council, Legislative Assembly and Executive Council to pledge allegiance to the Queen her heirs and successors. The oath was replaced with an oath of loyalty to Australia and to the people of New South Wales.

Legislative Council or Legislative Assembly
 (1) A Member of the Legislative Council or the Legislative Assembly is not permitted to sit or vote in the House to which the Member has been elected until the Member has taken the pledge of loyalty before the Governor or other person authorised by the Governor for that purpose.
 (2) The pledge of loyalty is to be in the following form: 
 Under God, I pledge my loyalty to Australia and to the people of New South Wales.
 (3) A Member may omit the words "Under God" when taking the pledge of loyalty.
 (4) A Member is not required, despite any other Act or law, to swear allegiance to Her Majesty Queen Elizabeth II or her heirs and successors before sitting or voting in the Legislative Council or the Legislative Assembly.
 (5) This section applies only to Members elected after the commencement of the Constitution Amendment (Pledge of Loyalty) Act 2006.

Executive Council
 (1) Before assuming office, a person appointed as a member of the Executive Council is to take:
 (a) the pledge of loyalty, and
 (b) the Executive Councillor's oath of office, before the Governor or other person authorised by the Governor for that purpose.
 (2) The pledge of loyalty is to be in the following form:
 Under God, I pledge my loyalty to Australia and to the people of New South Wales.
 (3) A member of the Executive Council may omit the words "Under God" when taking the pledge of loyalty.
 (4) The Executive Councillor's oath of office is to be in the following form:
 I, being appointed as a member of the Executive Council of New South Wales, do swear that I will perform the functions and duties of an Executive Councillor faithfully and to the best of my ability and, when required to do so, freely give my counsel and advice to the Governor or officer administering the Government of New South Wales for the time being for the good management of the public affairs of New South Wales, and that I will not directly or indirectly reveal matters debated in the Council and committed to my secrecy, but that I will in all things be a true and faithful councillor. So help me God.
(5) A member of the Executive Council may, instead of taking the Executive Councillor's oath, make an affirmation to the same effect.
(6) This section applies only to members of the Executive Council appointed after the commencement of the Constitution Amendment (Pledge of Loyalty) Act 2006.

Restoration of Oaths of Allegiance Act 2012
On 5 June 2012, the Constitution Amendment (Restoration of Oaths of Allegiance) Act 2012 No 33 was assented to and made a further amendment to the Constitution Act 1902, by restoring the option of taking the oath of allegiance to the Queen, her heirs and successors, in addition to the option of taking the pledge of loyalty. The change applies to members of Legislative Council, Legislative Assembly and Executive Council.

See also
 Perth Agreement
 Succession to the Crown Bill 2012
 Royal Succession Bills and Acts
 Succession to the Throne Act, 2013

References

External links
Government of New South Wales website
New South Wales Government Annual Reports and Other Publications 
 

Oaths of allegiance
New South Wales legislation